David Estrada may refer to:

 David Estrada (boxer) (born 1978), Guatemalan-American boxer
 David Estrada (lawyer) (born 1968), autonomous vehicle lawyer
 David Estrada (soccer) (born 1988), Mexican footballer